The President of the Statistical Society of Canada is the highest officer of the Statistical Society of Canada (SSC).

List of presidents

20th Century
1972-1974 Norm Shklov
1974-1975 Pierre Robillard
1975-1976 Charles S. Carter
1976-1978 David F. Bray
1979 Donald G. Watts
1980 Urs R. Maag
1981 Ivan P. Fellegi
1982 Charles Dunnett
1983 Michael A. Stephens
1984 James G. Kalbfleisch
1985 David F. Andrews
1986-1987 Martin B. Wilk
1987-1988 James V. Zidek
1988-1989 Robert Cléroux
1989-1990 Geoffrey J.C. Hole
1990-1991 Peter D.M. Macdonald
1991-1992 Agnes M. Herzberg
1992-1993 Christopher A. Field
1993-1994 Jerald F. Lawless
1994-1995 R. James Tomkins
1995-1996 Marc Moore
1996-1997 Richard A. Lockhart
1997-1998 Jane F. Gentleman
1998-1999 David R. Bellhouse
1999-2000 John D. (Jack) Kalbfleisch

21st Century
2000-2001 Louis-Paul Rivest
2001-2002 David R. Brillinger
2002-2003 James O. Ramsay
2003-2004 Mary E. Thompson
2004-2005 Nancy M. Reid
2005-2006 David A. Binder
2006-2007 Charmaine Dean
2007-2008 Christian Genest
2008-2009 Román Viveros-Aguilera
2009-2010 Bovas Abraham
2010-2011 Donald L. McLeish
2011-2012 John F. Brewster
2012-2013 Christian Léger
2013-2014 Michael J. Evans
2014-2015 A. John Petkau
2015-2016 O. Brian Allen
2016-2017 Jack Gambino
2017-2018 Hugh Chipman
2018-2019 Robert Platt
2019-2020 Bruce Smith
2020-2021 Wendy Lou
2021-2022 Grace Yi
2021-2022 Bruno Rémillard

External links
Historical List of the Board of Directors

 
Statistical Society of Canada
Presidents of statistical organizations
Statistics-related lists